These are the number-one albums in the United States per Billboard magazine during the year 1963. Prior to August 1963, separate charts existed for albums in mono and stereo formats. The chart is now known as the 'Billboard 200'.

Chart history through August 10

Chart history August 17 to end of year

See also
1963 in music
List of number-one albums (United States)

References

1963
Number-one albums of 1963 (U.S.)